Boloria iphigenia  is an east Palearctic  butterfly in the family Nymphalidae (Heliconiinae). It is found in Japan, east Amur, Ussuri and northeast China

The larva feeds on Viola selkirkii and Viola grypoceras.

Subspecies
B. i. iphigenia
B. i. alpharatoria Korb, 1997 (Sakhalin, Kunashir)

References

Butterflies described in 1888
Butterflies of Asia
Boloria